Hugh Conaghan (6 May 1926 – 24 March 2020) was an Irish Fianna Fáil politician and transport official. He was an unsuccessful candidate at the Donegal North-East by-election on 10 June 1976. 

He was elected to Dáil Éireann as Fianna Fáil Teachta Dála (TD) for the Donegal constituency at the 1977 general election. He was elected at the 1981 general election for the Donegal North-East constituency and was re-elected for this constituency until he lost his seat at the 1989 general election. He lost his seat to party colleague Jim McDaid. He was an unsuccessful candidate at the 1992 general election.

Hugh Conaghan died on 24 March 2020.

References

1926 births
2020 deaths
Fianna Fáil TDs
Members of the 21st Dáil
Members of the 22nd Dáil
Members of the 23rd Dáil
Members of the 24th Dáil
Members of the 25th Dáil
Local councillors in County Donegal
Politicians from County Donegal